Bryan Matthew Ward (born January 28, 1972) is a former Major League Baseball pitcher. He batted and threw left-handed.

Career
Bryan Ward graduated in 1991 from Rancocas Valley Regional High School in Mount Holly, New Jersey. He played for the USC Aiken Pacers in the 1993 season before being drafted by the Florida Marlins in the 20th round of the 1993 amateur draft.

References

External links

1972 births
Living people
Acereros de Monclova players
Algodoneros de Torreón players
American expatriate baseball players in Canada
American expatriate baseball players in Mexico
Anaheim Angels players
Baseball players from New Jersey
Baseball players from Pennsylvania
Birmingham Barons players
Brevard County Manatees players
Camden Riversharks players
Charlotte Knights players
Chicago White Sox players
Colorado Springs Sky Sox players
Edmonton Trappers players
Elmira Pioneers players
Gulf Coast Red Sox players
Kane County Cougars players
Major League Baseball pitchers
Mexican League baseball pitchers
Pawtucket Red Sox players
People from Bristol, Pennsylvania
Philadelphia Phillies players
Portland Sea Dogs players
Rancocas Valley Regional High School alumni
Sarasota Red Sox players
Saraperos de Saltillo players
Scranton/Wilkes-Barre Red Barons players
Sportspeople from Bucks County, Pennsylvania
Sportspeople from Burlington County, New Jersey
Tacoma Rainiers players
USC Aiken Pacers baseball players